Andronikos Asen Zaccaria de Damala or Asanes (died 1401) was a Genoese lord of the Principality of Achaea in southern Greece.

Life
Andronikos Asen Zaccaria was the son of Centurione I Zaccaria, member of the Genoese Zaccaria dynasty, and a woman of the Bulgarian–Byzantine Asen/Asanes family. Centurione was one of the most powerful lords of the Principality of Achaea, being Grand Constable as well as lord of Estamira, Chalandritsa and Lisarea.

Sometime around 1386, Centurione died and Andronikos Asen Zaccaria inherited the Barony of Chalandritsa and the title of Grand Constable of Achaea. He married a daughter of Erard III Le Maure, Baron of Arcadia, and when the latter died in 1388 without a male heir (his sole son having died young), Asen Zaccaria added Arcadia to his possessions. Being furthermore the brother-in-law of the vicar-general of the Navarrese Company and later Prince of Achaea (1396–1402), Peter of Saint Superan, he occupied a pre-eminent position within the Principality, on par only with the Latin Archbishop of Patras. 

On 4 June 1395, together with Saint Superan, he was defeated and captured by the Byzantine Greeks of the Despotate of the Morea, but was released in December, after the Venetians paid a ransom of 50,000 hyperpyra for him and Saint Superan. In 1396, he received a letter from Pope Boniface IX, which extended papal protection over him and urged him to fight against the growing menace of the Ottoman Turks. 

Andronikos Asen Zaccaria died in 1401, and was succeeded by the eldest of his four sons, Centurione II Zaccaria, who in 1404 became the last Prince of Achaea, reigning until deposed by the Despotate of the Morea in 1430.

Family
From his marriage to an unknown lady of the Le Maure family, Andronikos Asen had four sons:

 Centurione II Zaccaria (died 1432), Prince of Achaea 1404–1430
 Erard IV Zaccaria
 Benedict Zaccaria (fl. 1412–18)
 Stephen Zaccaria (died 1424), Latin Archbishop of Patras 1404–1424

References

Sources

 
 

1401 deaths
Barons of Arcadia
Andronikos
Prisoners of war held by the Byzantine Empire
Year of birth unknown
Andronikos
13th-century people from the Principality of Achaea